Fritz Greenlee (born November 5, 1943) is a former American football linebacker. He played for the Montreal Alouettes in 1968, the San Francisco 49ers in 1969 and for the Edmonton Eskimos in 1970. Greenlee played college football at Northern Arizona University and was drafted by the Chicago Bears in the ninth round of the 1966 NFL Draft.

References

1943 births
Living people
American football linebackers
Air Force Falcons football players
Arizona Wildcats football players
Montreal Alouettes players
San Francisco 49ers players
Edmonton Elks players
Franklin High School (Seattle) alumni